Mane Minister (foaled 1988 in Kentucky, died in 2010) is an American Thoroughbred racehorse best remembered as the first (and , the only) horse to finish third in all three of the U.S. Triple Crown races. Bred by Normandy Farm in Lexington, Kentucky, he was out of the mare Lacework, whose sire was In Reality, winner of the 1967 Florida Derby and the leading sire of two-year-olds in 1977. Mane Minister's sire was Deputy Minister, the 1981 Canadian Horse of the Year and the  leading sire in North America in 1997 and 1998. Deputy Minister, his sire Vice Regent, and his grandsire Northern Dancer are all Canadian Horse Racing Hall of Fame inductees.

Purchased and raced by Californian Trudy McCaffery and Canadian John Toffan, Mane Minister scored his most important win in the 1991 Santa Catalina Stakes. He went that year on to finish third to Strike the Gold in the Kentucky Derby and third to Hansel in the Preakness and Belmont Stakes.

Retired to stud duty, in the United States Mane Minister notably sired Bosque Redondo, who raced for McCaffery and Toffan and in 2002 won the San Bernardino Handicap and Tokyo City Cup. Since 1997, Mane Minister has stood at stud in Brazil.

References
 Mane Minister's pedigree and partial racing stats
 Mane Minister's 1991 Kentucky Derby

1988 racehorse births
Thoroughbred family 22-d
Racehorses bred in Kentucky
Racehorses trained in the United States